State Highway 44 (SH 44) is a  long state highway in the U.S. state of Colorado. The western terminus is at Colorado Boulevard in Thornton, and the eastern terminus at SH 2 in Commerce City.

Route description
SH 44 runs , starting at a junction with SH 2, heading west across the South Platte River and ending at Colorado Boulevard in Thornton. The route west continues as 104th Avenue.

Major intersections

See also

 List of state highways in Colorado

References

External links

044
State Highway 044
Thornton, Colorado